The Kok River is a tributary river of the Mekong that flows in Chiang Rai and Chiang Mai provinces in northern Thailand.

Source 
The river originates in the Daen Lao Range, Shan State, Myanmar. It flows eastwards across the Myanmar–Thailand border, crossing  at the Thai border town of Tha Ton (also spelled "Thaton" ). It flows to Mae Ai District, Chiang Mai Province. Most of its length in Thailand is in Chiang Rai Province where it passes Mueang Chiang Rai District after which it bends northeastwards and flows through Mae Chan, Wiang Chai and Chiang Saen districts.

It is a wide, shallow, and slow-moving river.

For several kilometres downriver from Chiang Rai, the river becomes a lake, until it reaches the irrigation dam near Wiang Chai.

The Kok River is a tributary of the Mekong River, with its mouth at Sop Kok in Chiang Saen District, opposite the Lao border.

Phahonyothin Road crosses this river near Chiang Rai City. Altogether, there are five bridges crossing the Kok River near Chiang Rai city.

Tributaries
The main tributaries of the Kok River are the Fang and the Lao River, the latter having its source in the Phi Pan Nam Range.

Dams
There is a small dam with 11 gates which provides irrigation for rice fields east of Chiang Rai. It turns the river into a lake, several miles long, for eight months of the year.

Top Gear
In October 2013 the cast and crew of the British television show Top Gear constructed a bridge over the Kok as part of their Burma Special. The bridge was originally planned to be built over the River Kwai, but the River Fang which flows into the Kok was chosen "accidentally". The show aired in two parts on 9 March 2014 and 16 March 2014.

Following production of the episode, the bridge was taken down, despite the producers and crew wanting it to stay in use for the locals.

References

External links
Kok and Northern Mekong RBC
Thailand: flooding hit several northern and northeastern provinces
Some Selected Wetlands in the Mekong River Basin of Thailand
Kok River Basin in Thailand

Kok
Rivers of Myanmar
International rivers of Asia
Tributaries of the Mekong River
Geography of Chiang Rai province